Gallin-Kuppentin is a municipality in the Ludwigslust-Parchim district, in Mecklenburg-Vorpommern, Germany.

References

Ludwigslust-Parchim